Pimelea leptostachya is a species of flowering plant in the family Thymelaeaceae and is endemic to central Queensland. It is a shrub with narrowly elliptic leaves and spikes of maroon or yellow, tube-shaped flowers arranged in groups of 13 to 23.

Description
The upper surface of the leaves is glabrous and the lower surface is covered with coarse hairs pressed against the surface. Flowering has been observed from May to June and from October to December.

Taxonomy
Pimelea leptostachya was first formally described in 1873 by George Bentham in Flora Australiensis from specimens collected by Edward Bowman. The specific epithet (leptostachya) means "slender flower spike".

Distribution and habitat
This pimelea grows on hillsides, often near sandstone cliffs or rocks, between Capella, Injune, Springsure and Rockhampton in central Queensland.

Conservation status
Pimelea leptostachya is listed as "least concern" under the Queensland Government Nature Conservation Act 1992.

References

Malvales of Australia
leptostachya
Flora of Queensland
Taxa named by George Bentham
Plants described in 1873